Rasmus may refer to:

People 
 Rasmus (given name)
 Rasmus (surname)

Arts and entertainment 
 The Rasmus, a Finnish rock band formerly called Rasmus
 The Rasmus (album), a self-titled studio album by the Finnish band
 the title character of Rasmus Klump, a Danish comic strip series
 Rasmus, a character in books by Swedish author Astrid Lindgren

Places 
 Rasmus, Michigan, an unincorporated community

See also
Rasmussen ("Rasmus' Son"), family name derived from "Rasmus"
Erasmus (disambiguation)